José Gregorio Hernández Cisneros OFS (26 October 1864 – 29 June 1919) was a Venezuelan physician. Born in Isnotú, Trujillo State, he became a highly renowned doctor, more so after his death. He was beatified by the Catholic Church in 2021.

Early life and education 

José Gregorio Hernández Cisneros was born on 26 October 1864 in Isnotú, a small village in the state of Trujillo in Venezuela.

He spent the entirety of his childhood in his hometown, where his mother worked as a housekeeper and his father sold pharmaceuticals and livestock. Hernández was baptised on 30 January 1865 in the Colonial Temple of Escuque (now the Parochial Church of Niño Jesús de Escuque.) He received the sacrament of Confirmation on 6 December 1867 by Juan Bonet, Bishop of  Mérida.

At the age of thirteen, Hernández expressed to his parents his desire to go to law school and become a lawyer, but was convinced by his mother to pursue a career in medicine. So, in 1878, he began his long and rigorous journey from the Andes Mountain Range in Trujillo to Caracas. He enrolled in Colegio Villegas, one of the country's most prestigious schools at the time, where, in 1882, he graduated with a baccalaureate in philosophy. 

After completing his high school education, Hernández enrolled in Universidad Central de Venezuela (UCV) to begin his medical studies. Throughout his six years of at UCV, he was described by his professors as a student of outstanding academic performance and conduct.

Career 
In 1888 Hernández graduated as a medical doctor at Universidad Central de Venezuela, in Caracas. The Venezuelan government awarded him a grant to continue his studies in Europe. Hernández traveled to Paris, where he studied other fields of medicine such as: bacteriology, pathology, microbiology, histology, and physiology. Following his return to Venezuela, he became a leading doctor at the Hospital José María Vargas.

Between 1891 and 1916, Hernández dedicated himself to teaching, medicine, and religious practice. He sought priesthood on two occasions, but his fragile physical conditions would ultimately prevent him from achieving that status. He studied at the Monastery of Lucca in Italy for ten months in 1908. In 1913, he enrolled at the Latin American Pío School of Rome to continue the priestly career, but had to return to Venezuela for health reasons. Among his scientific publications are The Elements of Bacteriology (1906), About the Angina Pectoris of Malaric Origin (1909) and The Elements of Philosophy (1912).

Hernández treated the poor for free and even bought them medicines with his own money.

With the arrival of 1918 Spanish flu in Venezuela, Hernández attended the contagious in Caracas. Hernández died in 1919, after being struck by a car.

His remains are housed in La Candelaria Catholic Church in Caracas, Venezuela.

Beatification 
After his death, Hernández' stature began to reach mythic proportions. People around the country started claiming to have been granted miracles after praying for his intercession to God. At present, Hernández is commonly invoked as "José Gregorio" by both doctors and patients for healing purposes. He is also called upon for protection during overland journeys. Eventually, his name became known all over Latin America and Spain.

In 1949, Venezuelan Catholic Church officials began the process of determining whether or not Hernández was eligible for sainthood. The Vatican granted him the title of Venerable in 1985. The next step in the process for Hernández is that of beatification. In June 2020, Pope Francis orders the beatification of Hernández, after the recovery of a girl that was shot in the head, reported as a miracle attributed to Hernández.

Legacy

He is, also, revered by Venezuela's alternative and syncretic religion the cult of Maria Lionza. Historian Steven Palmer also has drawn parallels between the Hernández cult and that of the assassinated Costa Rican physician and politician Ricardo Moreno Cañas.

A private university in Maracaibo, Universidad Dr. José Gregorio Hernández (launched in 2003), is named for him. In 2008 he was honoured with the naming of a Bolivarian Mission, Misión Dr. José Gregorio Hernández, dedicated to the health of Venezuelans with disabilities. In 2011, Hernández' birthday, 26 October, was declared a "day of national celebration". On 26 August 2014, the Catholic Bishops Conference of Venezuela called on all Catholics to attend Mass and thank God "for the life and example of this great Venezuelan, with great hope and implore the grace of his speedy beatification" on the occasion of the 150th anniversary of Hernández' birth (Sunday, 26 October 2014).

Hernández is also an important folk figure and is commonly portrayed in naïve art.

Publications
 1893 - Sobre el número de glóbulos rojos. Gaceta Médica de Caracas.
 1894 - Sobre angina de pecho de naturaleza paludosa. Gaceta Médica de Caracas.
 1910 - Lecciones de bacteriología. Gaceta Médica de Caracas.
 1910 - Lesiones anatomo–patológicas de la pulmonía simple o crupal. Gaceta Médica de Caracas.
 1910 - De la nefritis a la fiebre amarilla. Gaceta Médica de Caracas.
 1913 - Renuncia ante la Academia Nacional de Medicina. Gaceta Médica de Caracas.
 1918 - Nota preliminar acerca del tratamiento de la tuberculosis por el aceite de Chaulmoogra. Gaceta Médica de Caracas.
 1922 - Elementos de bacteriología. 2.ª edición: Caracas. El Cojo.
 1959 - Elementos de filosofía. 3.ª edición: Caracas. Bibliográfica Venezolana.
 1968 - Obras completas. Caracas. Universidad Central de Venezuela.

References

External links
José Gregorio Hernández Biography

See also

1864 births
1919 deaths
19th-century Venezuelan physicians
Central University of Venezuela alumni
Folk saints
Venezuelan people of Canarian descent
Venezuelan Roman Catholics
People from Trujillo (state)
19th-century venerated Christians
Road incident deaths in Venezuela
Pedestrian road incident deaths
Venezuelan people of Spanish descent
Venerated Catholics by Pope John Paul II
Venezuelan beatified people
Beatifications by Pope Francis
20th-century Venezuelan physicians
Death in Caracas